Iceberg Peak is a mountain located on Vancouver Island, British Columbia, Canada.  Within the boundaries of Strathcona Provincial Park, this peak lies at the south end of Rees Ridge.  Mount Celeste lies at the north end of this ridge.

History
The first ascent of this peak is credited to the Bill Bell survey party in the 1930s.

References

Sources

External links
 Strathcona Provincial Park

One-thousanders of British Columbia
Landforms of Vancouver Island
Vancouver Island Ranges
Clayoquot Land District